Mervyn Archdall (16 February 1833 – 18 May 1913) was the 7th Bishop of Killaloe, Kilfenora, Clonfert and Kilmacduagh.

Educated at Trinity College, Dublin, he was Vicar of Templebready from  1863 to 1872 and then of Rector of St Lukes's Cork until 1894, also holding the position of Archdeacon of Cork from 1878. After this he was Dean of Cork until his elevation to the episcopate.  in 1897. He resigned his see in 1912.

References

1833 births
1913 deaths
Alumni of Trinity College Dublin
Archdeacons of Cork
Deans of Cork
19th-century Anglican bishops in Ireland
20th-century Anglican bishops in Ireland
Bishops of Killaloe and Clonfert